Zaid Shakir (born Ricky Daryl Mitchell, May 24, 1956) is an American Muslim scholar and co-founder of Zaytuna College in Berkeley, California. He teaches courses on Arabic, law, history, and Islamic spirituality.

Shakir is co-founder and chairman of United For Change, whose stated goal is to leverage the diversity of the Muslim and interfaith community and address divisive obstacles. In 2015, he signed the official Memorandum of Understanding between Zaytuna College and Hartford Seminary in Connecticut. He is one of the signatories of A Common Word Between Us and You, an open letter by Islamic scholars to Christian leaders, calling for peace and understanding.
 
Shakir assumed leadership of the Muslim Alliance in North America (MANA) from 2020 until 2022, which is a broad-based alliance of Muslims dedicated to striving for justice and promoting what they deem as the "life-giving truth" of Islam. He has been listed in the 500 Most Influential Muslims (also known as The Muslim 500), an annual publication compiled by the Royal Islamic Strategic Studies Centre in Amman, Jordan, which ranks the most influential Muslims in the world.

Inspired to work with religious groups on sustainable development and climate change, he has taken "action for the earth" in partnership with the organization Green Faith. The organizations mission is to "inspire, educate, organize, and mobilize people of diverse religious and spiritual backgrounds around the globe for environmental action."

Zaid Shakir is one of many signatories to a statement prepared by religious leaders from around the world who presented the UN Secretary General with a declaration in support of the Paris Climate Agreement.

Early life

Shakir was born in 1956 in Berkeley, California as Ricky Daryl Mitchell to a family descended from African, Irish and Native American roots. His formative years were spent in housing projects in New Britain Connecticut. He converted to Islam in 1977 while serving in the United States Air Force and shortly after changed his name to Zaid Salim Shakir.

Education

A summa cum laude graduate, he obtained a BA in International Relations at American University in Washington, D.C., earned his MA in Political Science at Rutgers University. He then left for Syria to pursue his studies in the traditional Islamic Sciences. For seven years in Syria, and briefly in Morocco, he immersed himself in an intense study of Arabic, Islamic law, Quranic studies, and spirituality with Islamic scholars such as Sheikh ʿAbd al-Raḥmān al-Shāghūrī and Sheikh Mustafa Al-Turkmani. In 2001, he was the first American male graduate from Syria's Abu Nour University with a BA in Islamic Sciences.

Recent work in the United States
Zaytuna College

In 2003, as a scholar-in-residence at Zaytuna Institute located in California, Shakir began to teach Arabic, Law, and Islamic spirituality. In 2004, he initiated a pilot seminary program at Zaytuna Institute, which was useful in Zaytuna College's refinement of its Islamic Studies curriculum and its educational philosophy. For four years, students in the pilot program were engaged in the study of contemporary and classical texts. And, in the fall of 2010, he and his colleagues Hamza Yusuf, and Hatem Bazian co-founded the Berkeley, California based Zaytuna College, a four-year Muslim liberal arts college, the first of its kind in the United States, dedicated to "educate and prepare morally committed professional, intellectual, and spiritual leaders", who are grounded in the Islamic scholarly tradition and conversant with the cultural currents and critical ideas shaping modern society. In 2016, Zaytuna College became the first accredited Muslim campus in the United States after it received approval from the Western Association of Schools and Colleges.

Views
As reported in The New York Times, Zaid Shakir appeared with nine other influential Muslim scholars in a YouTube video denouncing militant Islam. The aftermath of 9/11 Shakir states, "People all over the world have felt the repercussions and the reprisals for the senseless brutality of 9/11's perpetrators. Our best hope is to attempt to move beyond the pain, strife and hatred unleashed. Trusting in the power and promise of God we will be able to do just that."

The Chronicle of Higher Education has praised him, stating, "Embodying an American story if ever there was one—including proverbial bootstraps, military service, political activism, and deep religious commitment—Zaid Shakir's message of social justice in the face of poverty and racism he has known first hand makes him endlessly and, it often seems, effortlessly relevant. He is as approachable a man as I've ever met."

Shakir states in Scapegoats: How Islamophobia Helps Our Enemies & Threatens Our Freedoms, "Sharia forbids members of a Muslim minority [in Western societies] from engaging in clandestine acts of violence and paramilitary organizing... or from acting as political or military agents for a Muslim-majority country. Islamic law also forbids the disruption of public safety, many of the practices that the average person fearfully associates with some Muslims today, like killing innocent people (non-Muslims and Muslims alike) and stoning women."

Reception

The 500 Most Influential Muslims of the world edition 2020 describes Zaid Shakir as "an influential Islamic scholar and a voice of conscience for American Muslims and non-Muslims alike", edited by John Esposito and Ibrahim Kalin

Tikkun Daily states that he is "one of the most thoughtful and dynamic teachers about the true nature of Islam in America today".

Zaid Shakir was named in CNN's 2018 list of "25 Influential American Muslims", where he was described as "one of the West's most respected Muslim scholars."

Publications

References

External links

 Zaid Shakir Audio Lectures

1950 births
Living people
African-American Sunni Muslims
American people of Irish descent
American imams
21st-century imams
American motivational speakers
Muslim apologists
Muslim reformers
20th-century Muslim theologians
American University School of International Service alumni
People from New Britain, Connecticut
Religious leaders from Connecticut
Rutgers University alumni
Shafi'i fiqh scholars
Writers from Berkeley, California
Writers from Oakland, California
American Muslim activists
Activists from California
American Sunni Muslim scholars of Islam